Norman A.J. Sykes (16 October 1936 – 9 December 2009) was a professional footballer who played in The Football League for Bristol Rovers, Plymouth Argyle, Stockport County, and Doncaster Rovers between 1953 and 1967.

Sykes played youth football for various teams in his home town of Bristol before signing his first professional contract with Bristol Rovers on his seventeenth birthday, with whom he spent twelve years, including one year as a youth team player. In 1961 he had an unsuccessful  trial with Chelsea and returned to Bristol Rovers until in 1964 he joined Plymouth Argyle for a transfer fee of £2,000, but during his time there he was dogged by injury and made just three League appearances for them. In the summer of 1964 he played in the Eastern Canada Professional Soccer League with Toronto City. 

He played 52 League games for Stockport County in seventeen months between September 1965 and February 1967, before spending the remainder of the 1966–67 season with Doncaster Rovers. Following that he dropped down to non-League football, where he played for Altrincham.

After his footballing career Sykes opened a teetotal nightclub in Manchester in 1975, and later lived and worked in Manchester.

References

1936 births
2009 deaths
Footballers from Bristol
English footballers
Association football midfielders
English Football League players
Bristol Rovers F.C. players
Plymouth Argyle F.C. players
Stockport County F.C. players
Doncaster Rovers F.C. players
Altrincham F.C. players
Toronto City players
Eastern Canada Professional Soccer League players